The Chicago Review of Books is an online literary publication of StoryStudio Chicago which reviews recent books covering diverse genres, presses, voices, and media. The magazine was started in 2016 and Adam Morgan is the founding editor-in-chief. He edited the magazine until July 2019 when Amy Brady was named the editor-in-chief. Besides book reviews, the magazine also published interviews, features, and essays. It is considered a sister publication of Arcturus, which publishes original fiction, non-fiction, and poetry.

References

External links

2016 establishments in Illinois
Book review magazines
Magazines established in 2016
Magazines published in Chicago
Online literary magazines published in the United States